The Bay of Mecklenburg ( or Mecklenburgische Bucht), also known as the Mecklenburg Bay or Mecklenburg Bight, is a long narrow basin making up the southwestern finger-like arm of the Baltic Sea, between the shores of Germany to the south and the Danish islands of Lolland, Falster, and Møn to the north, the shores of Jutland to the west, and joining the largest part of the Baltic to the east.

The Bay of Mecklenburg, which includes the Bay of Wismar and the Bay of Lübeck, connects to the Bay of Kiel in the northwest. Notable ports in the bay are Lübeck, Rostock and Wismar.

See also
 List of lighthouses and lightvessels in Denmark
 List of lighthouses and lightvessels in Germany

External links 

Mecklenburg
Mecklenburg
Bays of Denmark
Mecklenburg